Hayland is an unincorporated community in Adams County, Nebraska, United States.

History
Hayland got its start in the year 1912, following construction of the railroad through the territory.

References

Unincorporated communities in Adams County, Nebraska
Unincorporated communities in Nebraska